Pablo Alberto Bocco (born May 3, 1974) is an Argentine football manager and former player.

References

Living people
1974 births
Argentine footballers
Association football forwards
Club Atlético Belgrano footballers
Real Sociedad de Zacatecas footballers
Toros Neza footballers
Club Atlético Zacatepec players
Estudiantes de Río Cuarto footballers
F.C. Motagua players
Tampico Madero F.C. footballers
Deportivo Roca players
Tiro Federal footballers
Liga MX players
Ascenso MX players
Argentine football managers
Liga MX Femenil managers
Footballers from Córdoba, Argentina